Dundee West is a constituency of the House of Commons of the Parliament of the United Kingdom. It elects one Member of Parliament (MP) by the first-past-the-post voting system.

The constituency was created for the 1950 general election, when the two-seat Dundee constituency was split into two single seat constituencies: Dundee East and Dundee West.

Boundaries 

1950–1974: The County of the City of Dundee wards numbers 2, 3, 6, 7, 8, and 9.

1974–1983: The County of the City of Dundee wards of Balgay, Camperdown, Downfield, Law, Lochee, and Riverside. The constituency boundaries remained unchanged.

1983–1997: The City of Dundee District electoral divisions of Ardler/Blackside, Central/Riverside, Downfield/St Mary's, Dudhope/Logie, Gourdie/Pitalpin, Law/Ancrum, Lochee, Menziehill/Ninewells, Rockwell/Fairmuir, and Trottick/Gillburn.

1997–2005: The City of Dundee District electoral divisions of Central, Charleston, Kingsway West, Kirkton, Law, Lochee, Ninewells, Riverside, and St Mary's.

2005–present: The area of the Dundee City Council other than that part in the Dundee East Burgh Constituency, and the Angus Council ward of Sidlaw West.

The constituency is one of two covering the City of Dundee council area, the other being Dundee East. Current boundaries were first used in the 2005 general election.

As well as covering a western portion of the city area, the West constituency also includes, to the north and west, part of the Angus council area. Similarly, the east constituency includes, to the north and east, another part of the Angus council area.

Prior to the 2005 election, both constituencies were entirely within the city area, and the north-eastern and north-western areas of the city were within the Angus constituency. Scottish Parliament constituencies retain the older boundaries.

Politics and history of the constituency 

Dundee West was held by the Labour Party from the first time it was contested in 1950 until the 2015 general election. Initially it was more marginal than its neighbour Dundee East. Additionally the Labour candidate always polled more than 50% of the votes cast in these contests. However, in 1959 Labour's majority over Conservative candidate was only 714 votes. This majority greatly increased at the 1963 by-election and by
1970, Labour's majority and share of the vote in Dundee West was better than the same figures in Dundee East.

Labour's majority was reduced in 2005 by the SNP candidate  Joe Fitzpatrick despite changes to the boundaries which should have favoured Labour; suggesting that the constituency might be becoming more marginal, although the gap widened again in 2010. The current MP is Chris Law, who was the first-ever MP from the Scottish National Party elected for Dundee West; as part of the party's near-clean sweep of the majority of Scottish seats at that year's general election.

Members of Parliament

Election results

Elections in the 2010s

Elections in the 2000s

Elections in the 1990s

Elections in the 1980s

Elections in the 1970s

Elections in the 1960s

Elections in the 1950s

References

Westminster Parliamentary constituencies in Scotland
Politics of Dundee
Constituencies of the Parliament of the United Kingdom established in 1950